Cyrille Charles (birth February 15, 1977 in St Lucia) is a former Saint Lucian cricketer who played for the Saint Lucia national cricket team in Stanford 20/20 in West Indian domestic cricket. He played as a right-handed batsman as well as right-arm medium-fast bowler.

References

External links

1977 births
Living people
Saint Lucian cricketers
Windward Islands cricketers